Maj-Britt Gabriella Bæhrendtz (née Pohlmer; 23 May 1916 – 15 July 2018) was a Swedish writer and radio host.

Bæhrendtz was born in Strängnäs in May 1916. She was married to the writer Nils Erik Bæhrendtz from 1943 until his death in 2002, and was one of the hosts of the radio program Sommar i P1. Bæhrendtz died in July 2018 at the age of 102.

Selected works 
 1959: Döden en dröm
 1968: Rör på dig, ät rätt, må bra
 1970: Tio år med TV

References 

1916 births
2018 deaths
Sommar (radio program) hosts
Swedish centenarians
Swedish radio personalities
Swedish radio presenters
Swedish women radio presenters
Swedish women writers
Women centenarians
People from Strängnäs Municipality